Uppheimar ehf was an Icelandic publishing house based in the town of Akranes, which operated from 2001 to 2015.

History 
The company was established 11 January 2001 by the husband and wife team Kristján Kristjánsson (himself a writer) and Margrét Ţorvaldsdóttir. At first, the company was primarily a vehicle for the publication of the journal Árbók Akurnesinga. The company was given a boost when, in 2006-7, Ævar Örn Jósepsson chose to publish there, expanding its output to around 20 titles per year at that time. In 2009, the company set up an online book-club called Undirheima ('Underworld') to promote its translated and domestic crime fiction portfolio, which included the authors Ævar Örn Jósepsson, Liza Marklund, Jo Nesbø, Camilla Läckberg and Sara Blædel.

The company got into financial difficulties in 2013 and ceased trading in 2014, with 15 of its authors left unpaid for a substantial period. Its bank, Landsbanki, entered the company into bankruptcy proceedings in November 2015.

Authors 

Authors published by Uppheimar included:

 Ari Trausti Guðmundsson
 Bjarki Karlsson
 Bjarni Bjarnason
 Böðvar Guðmundsson
 Gyrðir Elíasson
 Ísak Harðarson
 Kristín Ómarsdóttir
 Ragnar Th. Sigurðsson
 Sigfús Bjartmarsson
 Sigmundur Ernir Rúnarsson
 Sigrún Davíðsdóttir
 Vilborg Arna Gissurardóttir

External links 

 Website, archived 24 February 2015, prior to closure.
 Entry in Icelandic company register.

References 

Literary publishing companies